Boronia Heights is a suburb in the City of Logan, Queensland, Australia.

Geography
Boronia Heights lies to the west of Park Ridge.

History
Boronia Heights was known as the Logan Ridges through to the early 1890s.

Boronia Heights State School opened on 29 January 1990.

Boronia Heights was gazetted as a suburb in October 1991 and was named after the first residential housing estate in the area.

Demographics
The median age of the Boronia Heights population was 30 years, 7 years below the national median of 37. 71.4% of people living in Boronia Heights were born in Australia. The other top responses for country of birth were New Zealand 7.4%, England 3.4%, Philippines 1.1%, India 0.9%, Fiji 0.7%. 83.6% of people spoke only English at home; the next most common languages were 1.3% Samoan, 0.8% Urdu, 0.8% Hindi, 0.7% German, 0.5% Mandarin.

Education
Boronia Heights State School is a government primary (Prep-6) school for boys and girls at 194 Middle Road. In 2018, the school had an enrolment of 638 students with 48 teachers (44 full-time equivalent) and 33 non-teaching staff (21 full-time equivalent). It includes a special education program.

Amenities
The Boronia Bushland Reserve offers opportunities for bushwalking, barbecues and picnics. The bushland is home to many species of Australian fauna including eastern grey kangaroos, bandicoots, goannas, possums and koalas. The area has many scribbly gums, characterised by the scribbly lines on the otherwise smooth grey trunks.

References

External links
 
 

Suburbs of Logan City